Majda Chebaraka (born 17 April 2000) is an Algerian swimmer.

She competed at the 2016 Arab Swimming Championships and the 2018 African Swimming Championships.

She represented Algeria at the 2015 African Games and won two gold medals, one silver medal and three bronze medals. She won six bronze medals at the 2019 African Games.

References

External links 
 

2000 births
Living people
Place of birth missing (living people)
Algerian female swimmers
Swimmers at the 2018 Summer Youth Olympics
African Games medalists in swimming
African Games gold medalists for Algeria
African Games silver medalists for Algeria
African Games bronze medalists for Algeria
Swimmers at the 2015 African Games
Swimmers at the 2019 African Games
21st-century Algerian women